On 19 March 2023, Swiss investment bank UBS Group AG agreed to buy Credit Suisse for  3 billion in an all-stock deal brokered by the government of Switzerland and the Swiss Financial Market Supervisory Authority. The Swiss National Bank supported the deal with an offer to provide up to CHF 100 billion ($104 billion) in liquidity to UBS following its takeover of Credit Suisse's operations, while the Swiss government provided a guarantee to UBS to cover losses of up to CHF 9 billion ($9.6 billion) over the short term. Additionally, CHF 16 billion ($17.2 billion) of Additional Tier 1 bonds were written down to zero.

Credit Suisse is a globally systemically important bank whose investment banking unit, First Boston, had been recently tarnished by a series of high-profile scandals. The banking crisis in the United States had caused fear among global investors and led to panic over other possibly troubled banks. Credit Suisse's share price plunged after the leading shareholder ruled out further investment into the bank due to regulatory issues.  The deal was rapidly agreed upon and announced just before the Asian financial markets opened on Monday morning in order to prevent "market shaking" turmoil in the global financial markets. Soon after, central banks across the world announced USD liquidity measures to try and ease wider market panic and avoid a wider banking crisis.

Background

Credit Suisse and the global financial crisis 
Credit Suisse was founded in 1856. Over the years the bank grew to a massive size, competing directly with other bulge bracket firms such as Goldman Sachs and Barclays. During the 2007–2008 financial crisis, Credit Suisse found itself in better financial shape compared to its peer banks; while the Swiss National Bank stepped in to rescue UBS after no private investor was willing to do so by purchasing of $60 billion of toxic assets and $5.3 billion in shares of stock from UBS as a form of a capital infusion, Credit Suisse raised a far smaller $9 billion privately from investors to shore up its financial position.

In the years following the financial crisis, the bank continued to have a high appetite for risk, while its global peers became more averse to risk. Credit Suisse kept its investment banking arm in the immediate years following the crisis—an arm that took risks aggressively in order to compete with large U.S. financial institutions—though many large U.S. banks and its Swiss counterpart UBS chose to pursued more conservative strategies and sold off riskier assets in an attempt to de-risk their own portfolios.

Losses in investment banking arm 
Between 2008 and 2023, Credit Suisse's investment banking arm underperformed, dragging down the business's profitability and causing significant losses. The bank suffered from a series of scandals and mismanagement, including losses in its investment arm associated with the collapses of Archegos Capital and Greensill Capital in 2021. The bank's internal control over financial reporting was flagged by its auditor, PwC, for the period 2020 to 2022.

March 2023 United States bank failures and contagion 

Following the collapse of Silicon Valley Bank in the United States, shares in the global banking sector had fallen sharply. The S&P Banks index declined 22% over two weeks to 18 March. The U.S. bank failures had caused wider concern over pressure on the sector from interest rate hikes by Federal Reserve and other central banks.

Saudi National Bank (SNB) was Credit Suisse's largest shareholder, with almost 10%. On Wednesday, 15 March, when Bloomberg Television asked SNB chairman Ammar Al Khudairy whether his firm might further invest in Credit Suisse, he replied "The answer is absolutely not, for many reasons outside the simplest reason, which is regulatory and statutory", adding:

Credit Suisse stock declined up to 31% after his statement. Despite this, Credit Suisse's share price and the par value of bonds were down significantly, and daily withdrawals of demand deposits totaled over  later that same week. Regulators from the EU, the United States, the United Kingdom and Switzerland expected that Credit Suisse would have become insolvent in the week beginning 19 March had they not been bailed out or acquired by a fellow bank. U.S. investment management company BlackRock had explored options for acquiring parts of Credit Suisse, but dropped their effort on 17 March.

Negotiations
Negotiations surrounding an acquisition began on 15 March.

The final deal to purchase Credit Suisse for CHF 3 billion ($3.2 billion) was accepted by the board of Credit Suisse prior to the opening of Asian financial markets on Monday morning. The acquisition was an all-stock deal, with Credit Suisse shareholders receiving 1 UBS share per 22.48 Credit Suisse shares.

Acquisition
The acquisition was coordinated by the Swiss government, led by the Federal Department of Finance, the Swiss National Bank and the Financial Market Supervisory Authority (FINMA). In an emergency meeting on 19 March 2023, the Swiss Federal Council exercised emergency powers to allow the merger to take place without the approval of shareholders, and to provide Credit Suisse with additional liquidity assistance privileged against bankruptcy and backed by a governmental default guarantee. In addition, the Federal Council granted UBS a guarantee worth CHF 9 billion ($9.6 billion) for potential losses from risks associated with the transaction, after approval by a parliamentary committee. As part of the deal, CHF 16 billion ($17.2 billion) of Additional Tier 1 bonds (AT1) were written down to zero on FINMA's authorizationthe largest writedown of AT1 debt so far. The move forced larger losses on bondholders than on shareholders of Credit Suisse.

In a 19 March 2023 press conference, President of Switzerland Alain Berset, Minister of Finance Karin Keller-Sutter, and the head of the National Bank Thomas Jordan announced the acquisition, joined by the chairmen of UBS and CS. The government said that its exposure to risk was low, and that it considered the acquisition necessary for financial market stability in Switzerland and globally.

UBS Chairman Colm Kelleher stated that UBS did not initiate discussions, although he further added that the company considered the transaction "financially attractive for UBS shareholders". He further added that the deal was an "emergency rescue".

Reactions
The financial market authorities of the European Union and the United States issued statements in approval of the acquisition. Analysts have described the acquisition as a "shotgun wedding" arranged by the Swiss government.

Noting that Credit Suisse had been facing problems for several years, Senior Editor for CNN Business, Allison Morrow, stated, "[Silicon Valley Bank and Credit Suisse are] facing unrelated problems that happened to take place at the same time, worrying investors about the banking sector".

In Swiss politics, Keller-Sutter's center-right Free Democratic Party party approved of the government's intervention with regret, while the right-wing Swiss People's Party and the left-wing Social Democratic Party of Switzerland reacted with anger, denouncing "cronyism" and demanding that those responsible be held to account.

Analysts have warned that UBS-Credit Suisse deal could extend rather than end the banking crisis, mainly because of the write-off of AT1 bonds worth CHF16 billion. AJ Bell investment director Russ Mould said:

According to the Bank of England “clear statutory order” existed for bank resolutions, in that which AT1 holders would be exposed to losses after equity investors.

Impact
The combined entity will continue to be led by UBS CEO Ralph Hamers and chairman Colm Kelleher. Kelleher said that the deal would take a few weeks to close, and that UBS intends to engage in "de-risking" the "tricky businesses" run by Credit Suisse. He said that Credit Suisse would continue to operate as normal until the closing of the merger, and that nothing could yet be said about the merger's impact on Credit Suisse's employees. As part of the deal, UBS will wind down Credit Suisse's investment bank.

Credit Suisse's largest shareholders, including the Saudi National Bank (9.9% stake) and sovereign wealth funds Qatar Investment Authority (6.8% stake) and Norges Bank Investment Management are expected to take significant losses from the acquisition.

Other Swiss banks prepared to succeed Credit Suisse as the country's second-largest. Zurich Cantonal Bank CEO Urs Baumann said that his firm "offers all business areas of a universal bank and is thus a complement to the newly emerging big bank".

The takeover resulted in $17 billion of Credit Suisse-issued bonds being written off as worthless. This undermines the creditworthiness of the newly acquired bank. Property rights have also been seriously weakened in Switzerland because the transaction bypassed any shareholders statutory approval.

According to the Swiss institute for economic research and advice BAK Economics, 9,500 to 12,000 jobs are threatened in Switzerland; with job losses in Zurich estimated at between 6,500 and 8,000 FTEs.

References

2023 mergers and acquisitions
Announced mergers and acquisitions
Credit Suisse
Financial markets
March 2023 events in Switzerland
Mergers and acquisitions of Swiss companies
UBS acquisitions